The Cat and the Canary is a 1978 horror film directed by Radley Metzger and starring Honor Blackman, Michael Callan, Edward Fox, Wendy Hiller, Olivia Hussey, Wilfred Hyde-White, Beatrix Lehmann, Carol Lynley, Daniel Massey, and Peter McEnery. It follows a group of potential heirs who are summoned to the mansion of a deceased beneficiary to view the filmed reading of his will, only to discover upon arrival that a deranged killer may have infiltrated the event.

A co-production between the United States and United Kingdom, the film is the sixth film adaptation of John Willard's 1922 play of the same name.

Plot
In 1934, on the twentieth anniversary of his death, the remaining relatives (all cousins) of Cyrus West are summoned to his mansion in rural England to view the filmed reading of his last will and testament. Among them are former surgeon Harry Blythe; flamboyant stuntman Charlie Wilder, who has forged a successful career in California; Susan Sillsby, a noted English hunter; Cicily Young, Susan's female lover, also her cousin and roommate; the marginally successful American songwriter Paul Jones; and Annabelle West, a rising fashion designer. Overseeing the gathering is West's attorney, Allison Crosby, and Mrs. Pleasant, his longtime maid who looks after the now-abandoned manor.

Cyrus lets it be known in his reading how much he despised and loathed his kin by setting up a dogfight for the fortune and revealing that Annabelle West is to be the sole beneficiary. However, to claim the inheritance, Annabelle must spend the night in the house with the rest of the family and be deemed sane the next morning. Should she be unable to, West has a second reel of film in which he names the secondary heir. As the group prepare to turn in for the evening, they are startled by the arrival of Dr. Hendricks, a psychiatrist at a nearby sanitarium who warns them that a deranged, disfigured patient who believes himself to be a cat has escaped from the institution.

Allison urges the others to keep the revelation from Annabelle for fear of frightening her, but Susan breaks the news to her. However, Annabelle seems unbothered. Allison requests Annabelle meet her in the library, but Annabelle is startled when, while turned away from her, Allison vanishes behind a false bookcase. Annabelle alerts the others about the incident, but each have varying levels of suspicion regarding her claims, especially when taking into account the family's history of mental illness and delusions. Paul subsequently confides in Annabelle that he has discovers secret passageways beneath the mansion, and that he suspects Allison and Mrs. Pleasant may be hiding something. Later, Susan supplies Annabelle with a gun for self-protection.

Paul and Annabelle subsequently locate a precious West family heirloom—an extravagant gold necklace—in the house, frozen in a block of ice. Later, when Annabelle falls asleep, the trenchcoat-clad killer enters her room through a trapdoor and steals the necklace from her throat, awakening and terrifying her in the process. Her screams again alert the others, who rush to her bedroom. The group is initially suspicious of Annabelle's claims, until Paul locates the trapdoor and, upon opening it, discover's Allison's corpse, her bloodied head wrapped in a pillowcase.

When Paul goes to explore the basement tunnels, he is clobbered over the head by the killer, but survives. Shortly after, Susan is murdered by the killer in the dining hall while trying to locate West's second film reel. While Paul also proceeds to search for the reel to uncover the identity of the secondary heir, Annabelle arms herself with the gun given to her by Susan. On the staircase, she is confronted by the killer, who wrangles the weapon from her before dragging her into a room in the basement. A struggle ensues, during which Annabelle grabs at the killer's disfigured face, in effect removing a rubber mask, revealing the culprit to be Charlie. Charlie reveals that he is the secondary heir of West's fortune. Dr. Hendricks appears, and Annabelle runs to him for safety, but he too reveals himself to be in cahoots with Charlie.

Charlie and Hendricks chain Annabelle to a medical chair in the basement. Charlie momentarily returns upstairs, where is attacked by Paul, and a fight ensues. Mrs. Pleasant hears the commotion, and enters the parlor, where she shoots Charlie to death. Paul and Mrs. Pleasant then rush downstairs to save Annabelle, who is about to be mutilated and killed by Hendricks; they enter moments before he is about to stab her, and Paul shoots him to death.

At dawn, an ambulance arrives to remove the bodies, and Cicily departs the mansion. Meanwhile, Mrs. Pleasant prepares tea for Annabelle and Paul as they proceed to view West's second reel, in which he names Charlie the second heir.

Cast

Production
According to one film reviewer, Radley Metzger's films, including those made during the Golden Age of Porn (1969–1984), are noted for their "lavish design, witty screenplays, and a penchant for the unusual camera angle". Another reviewer noted that his films were "highly artistic — and often cerebral ... and often featured gorgeous cinematography". Film and audio works by Metzger have been added to the permanent collection of the Museum of Modern Art (MoMA) in New York City.

Pyrford Court, Pyrford Common Road, Surrey, was used as Cyrus West's Glenncliff Manor.

Release
The film screened at the Miami International Film Festival on 16 November 1978. It was later released regionally in the United States in 1981, opening on 8 May that year in Minneapolis, Minnesota.

Critical response
Richard L. Shepherd of The New York Times gave the film a favorable review, writing: "Whodunit? If you don't know the story, we'll only go so far as to say that Mr. Metzger dunit, the film, that is. He has a sure awareness of color, the black cat and the white halls, and the film is attractive enough to look at. The suspense is not evenly maintained, but it doesn't matter; this Cat and the Canary is a breezy, pleasant enough diversion for an hour and a half."

James Calloway of The News & Observer felt that the film "has some good ideas, but they are often handled unevenly...  One aspect of the film deserves high praise. The murderer is a ripper, but instead of making us watch the mutilation in progess, as most films nowadays would, Metzger instead shows us the killer's grotesque tools lined up neatly on a cloth. The effect is just as horrifying."

References

Sources

External links

 The Cat and the Canary at  MUBI (related to The Criterion Collection)
 
 
 The Cat and the Canary (1979) [complete film (01:30:40)]

1978 films
1978 horror films
1970s mystery films
American films based on plays
American haunted house films
American horror films
British films based on plays
British haunted house films
British horror films
British remakes of American films
LGBT-related horror films
Films about inheritances
Films directed by Radley Metzger
Films set in country houses
Films set in the 1930s
1970s English-language films
1970s American films
1970s British films